Pape Paté Diouf (born 4 April 1986) is a Senegalese professional footballer who last played as a striker for Arendal. Diouf has previously played for bigger clubs like FC Copenhagen, Molde FK, and Odds BK.

Career
Diouf began his career with SC de Rufisque and joined in January 2006 to Molde FK.

Following some impressive displays for Molde, Diouf moved to Superligaen side Copenhagen in the summer of 2011 for a reported DKK 18 mil fee.

After failing to make an impact for Copenhagen, Diouf was loaned back to his old club Molde, for the rest of the 2012 season, on 19 August 2012. In August 2013, he again moved on loan, this time to fellow Superligaen side Esbjerg fB.

On 31 March 2014, Diouf left Copenhagen permanently, returning to Molde on a three-year contract.

On 28 July 2015, Diouf moved to fellow Tippeligaen side Odds BK on loan for the remainder of the season.

Career statistics

Honours
Molde
Tippeligaen: 2011, 2012, 2014

Copenhagen
Danish Superliga: 2012–13
Danish Cup: 2011–12

References

External links
 Player profile on official club website 

1986 births
Living people
Footballers from Dakar
Association football forwards
Association football wingers
Senegalese footballers
Serer sportspeople
Molde FK players
F.C. Copenhagen players
Esbjerg fB players
Odds BK players
Eliteserien players
Norwegian First Division players
Danish Superliga players
Senegalese expatriate footballers
Expatriate footballers in Norway
Expatriate men's footballers in Denmark
Senegalese expatriate sportspeople in Norway
Senegalese expatriate sportspeople in Denmark